Alt.Latino is a radio show and podcast about Latin alternative music and Latinx culture on National Public Radio. The show launched in 2010 and is hosted by Felix Contreras and Anamaria Sayre. It features music as well as interviews with Latino musicians, actors, film makers and writers.

Hosts 
 Felix Contreras - co-founder and host. Contreras is from a Mexican American family in California. Previously, Contreras was a producer and reporter for NPR's Arts Desk. He is also a part-time musician who plays Afro-Cuban percussion with various jazz and Latin bands.
 Anamaria Artemisa Sayre - Sayre is from southern California and is of Mexican descent. She previously worked as a multimedia producer with NPR. Sayre began co-hosting the show with Contreras in September 2022.

Former hosts
 Jasmine Garsd Garcia - Garsd is a reporter and journalist originally from Buenos Aires, Argentina. She co-founded the show and was a co-host from 2010 through 2016, when she left to work at the BBC.

Notable work

References

External links 
 

NPR programs
Audio podcasts
American music websites
Latin American culture
2010 podcast debuts
American podcasts